Lüneburg was one of the four Regierungsbezirke of Lower Saxony, Germany, located in the north of the federal state between the three cities Bremen, Hamburg and Hanover.

The region was created under royal Hanoverian rule in 1823 as Landdrostei Lüneburg (roughly: High Bailiwick of Lüneburg), renamed Regierungsbezirk (roughly: governorate) in 1885, when it was a subdivision of the Prussian province of Hanover. On 1 February 1978 the Lüneburg Region incorporated the neighbouring Stade Region. The governorate, like all the other Lower Saxon governorates, was dissolved in 2004.

Kreise (districts)
 Celle
 Cuxhaven
 Harburg
 Lüchow-Dannenberg
 Lüneburg
 Osterholz
 Rotenburg
 Heidekreis
 Stade
 Uelzen
 Verden

Former states and territories of Lower Saxony
History of Lüneburg
Government regions of Prussia
States and territories established in 1885
States and territories disestablished in 2004
1823 establishments in the Kingdom of Hanover
2004 disestablishments in Germany
Former government regions of Germany